Paul Kerb (20 December 1929 – 5 November 2017) was an Austrian fencer from Vienna. He competed in the team sabre events at the 1952 and 1960 Summer Olympics.

References

External links
 

1929 births
2017 deaths
Austrian male sabre fencers
Olympic fencers of Austria
Fencers at the 1952 Summer Olympics
Fencers at the 1960 Summer Olympics
Fencers from Vienna